is a Japanese long-distance runner, who won the bronze medal in 10,000 metres at the 1997 World Championships in Athens and in the marathon race at the 2003 World Championships in Paris.

Chiba was a torchbearer during the 1998 Nagano Olympics Opening Ceremony.

Achievements

Personal bests
5000 metres - 15:20.58 min (1997)
10,000 metres - 31:20.46 min (1996)
Half marathon - 1:09:27 hrs (1999)
Marathon - 2:21:45 hrs (2003)

External links

marathoninfo

1976 births
Living people
Japanese female long-distance runners
Japanese female marathon runners
Athletes (track and field) at the 1996 Summer Olympics
Olympic athletes of Japan
Sportspeople from Kyoto Prefecture
World Athletics Championships medalists
20th-century Japanese women
21st-century Japanese women